The second Sudurpashchim Provincial Assembly was elected by the 2022 provincial elections on 20 November 2022. 87 members were elected to the assembly, 52 of whom were elected through direct elections and 35 of whom were elected through the party list proportional representation system. The first session of the assembly commenced from 2 January 2023.

Leaders

Officers 

 Speaker of the Assembly: Hon. Bhim Bahadur Bhandari (CPN (Maoist Centre))
 Deputy Speaker of the Assembly: Koili Devi Chaudhary (CPN (UML))
 Leader of the House (Chief Minister):
 Hon. Rajendra Singh Rawal (CPN (UML)) (until 9 February 2023)
 Hon. Kamal Bahadur Shah (Nepali Congress) (since 9 February 2023)
 Leader of the Opposition:
 Hon. Kamal Bahadur Shah (Nepali Congress) (until 9 February 2023)
 Hon. Khagaraj Bhatta (CPN (Maoist Centre)) (since 9 February 2023)

Parliamentary party 

 Parliamentary party leader of Nepali Congress: Hon. Kamal Bahadur Shah
 Parliamentary party leader of CPN (Maoist Centre): Hon. Khagaraj Bhatta
 Parliamentary party leader of CPN (UML): Hon. Rajendra Singh Rawal
 Deputy parliamentary party leader of CPN (UML): Hon. Santosh Kumar Sharma
 Parliamentary party leader of Nagrik Unmukti Party: Hon. Rameshwar Chaudhary
 Parliamentary party leader of CPN (Unified Socialist): Hon. Dirgha Bahadur Sodari
 Deputy parliamentary party leader of CPN (Unified Socialist): Hon. Prakash Rawal

Whips 

 Chief Whip of Nagrik Unmukti Party: Hon. Laxman Kishor Chaudhary
 Whip of Nagrik Unmukti Party: Hon. Ghanashyam Chaudhary
Chief Whip of CPN (Unified Socialist): Hon. Naresh Kumar Shahi
Whip of CPN (Unified Socialist): Hon. Maya Panta

Composition

Members

References

External links 

 समानुपातिक निर्वाचन प्रणाली तर्फको सुदुरपश्चिम प्रदेश सभामा निर्वाचित सदस्यहरुको विवरण

Members of the Provincial Assembly of Sudurpashchim Province